Fall Street–Trinity Lane Historic District is a national historic district located at Seneca Falls in Seneca County, New York.  The district includes the archaeological remains of 19th century industrial structures located on three islands in the Seneca River.  Also included are the limestone Trinity Church (1886) and its associated parish house (1916) and the red brick "The Armitage" historic home built about 1850.  Other structures include the board and batten "Cline's Barn" and a rectangular 1920s bandstand.

It was listed on the National Register of Historic Places in 1974.

References

Historic districts on the National Register of Historic Places in New York (state)
Archaeological sites in New York (state)
Historic districts in Seneca County, New York
National Register of Historic Places in Seneca County, New York
Seneca Falls, New York